The Federal University of Goiás (UFG) is a publicly funded university located in the Brazilian state of Goiás, headed in Goiânia and with campuses in the municipalities of Catalão, City of Goiás, and Jataí.

Founded on December 14, 1960, after the merger of previously existing colleges, UFG is the only federally funded institution of higher education in the state, the richest and most populous in the Central-West Region of Brazil. The activities of the university involves  28,899 students in 150 undergraduate courses.

According to the National Institute of Studies and Research on Education, linked to the Ministry of Education, UFG is the second best university in the Central-West Region, behind only University of Brasília.

The university administers the  Professor José Ângelo Rizzo Biological Reserve, a strictly protected conservation unit created in 1969 in the municipality of Mossâmedes.

Undergraduate courses

See also

References

External links 

 
  

 
Education in Goiás
1960 establishments in Brazil
Educational institutions established in 1960
Federal universities of Brazil